Bebearia oxione, the banded forester, is a butterfly in the family Nymphalidae. It is found in Sierra Leone, Liberia, Ivory Coast, Ghana, Togo, Nigeria, Cameroon, Gabon, the Republic of the Congo, Angola, the Central African Republic, the Democratic Republic of the Congo and Uganda. The habitat consists of forests.

Adults are attracted to fallen fruit.

The larvae feed on Marantochloa species, including M. purpurea.

Subspecies
Bebearia oxione oxione (Sierra Leone, Liberia, Ivory Coast, Ghana, Togo, Nigeria)
Bebearia oxione squalida (Talbot, 1928) (Cameroon, Gabon, Congo, Angola, Central African Republic, Democratic Republic of the Congo, Uganda)

References

Butterflies described in 1866
oxione
Butterflies of Africa
Taxa named by William Chapman Hewitson